The A2 class was an express passenger locomotive that ran on Victorian Railways from 1907 to 1963. A highly successful design entirely the work of Victorian Railways' own design office, its long service life was repeatedly extended as the Great Depression and later World War II delayed the introduction of more modern and powerful replacement locomotives.

History
The introduction of the A2 class marked a turning point in Victorian Railways locomotive design, as it was entirely designed by VR engineers of the newly established Locomotive Design Section and the entire class built in-house at Victorian Railways workshops.

Production
Based on the success of the prototype A2572, a total of 125 Stephenson valve gear A2 locomotives were built between 1907 and 1915. The design was then altered to incorporate larger diameter cylinders, a higher pressure boiler and Walschaerts valve gear, and a further 60 locomotives of that design were produced between 1915 and 1922.

Regular service
For over forty years, the A2was the main express passenger locomotive on the VR, hauling intrastate and interstate services. A2 locomotives famously ran the Geelong Flier, the first named train in Victoria, slashing journey times between Melbourne and Geelong from 90 minutes to 63 and, finally, 55 minutes, a time not significantly improved upon until the introduction of 160 km/h Regional Fast Rail services in 2006.

A2s were also used to haul a number of special services, such as the Royal Trains for Australian tours of Prince of Wales and the Duke of York, in 1920 and 1927 respectively. Towards the end of their lives, A2995 and 996 also had the distinction of hauling the last broad gauge Spirit of Progress service into Melbourne on 16 April 1962.

With their comparatively high tractive effort (the Walschaerts A2 had a higher nominal tractive effort than any other VR locomotive, regardless of type, until the introduction of the C class 2-8-0 of 1918), they also saw widespread use as a fast goods locomotive, particularly later in their life. As early as the 1920s, it was reported as normal practice that A2 class locomotives requiring adjustment to axle boxes and other moving parts be swapped from passenger to lower-speed freight service to extract more work from them between overhauls.

In 1933, two A2 class locomotives set a haulage record for Victorian Railways when they headed a 75-truck  wheat train from Benalla to Seymour.

Although initially limited to principal mainlines, due to their comparatively heavy axle load, gradual upgrades to secondary lines saw the route-availability of the class expand, together with the range of services they hauled.

In 1928, the A2 was replaced on the principal North East line Sydney Limited and Albury Express services by the considerably more powerful three-cylinder S class Pacifics. However, new locomotive development ground to a halt during the 1930s, with the Great Depression severely affecting both VR traffic volumes and operating revenues, so the A2 continued to be the main express passenger power on all other VR mainlines.

Design Improvements
The majority of A2 locomotives were originally built with saturated steam boilers. The class were gradually fitted with superheaters, and to differentiate between the two variants the saturated steam locomotives were renumbered as A1 class, each being reclassified as A2 class again when fitted with a superheater. Many engines were renumbered two or three times as the railways' management attempted to keep the two subclasses in different number blocks, and as the boundaries between the blocks shifted through the superheating program. The last of the A1 class, No. 808, was converted in October 1949.

Experiments were conducted in 1923–4 with A2 800 using Pulverised Brown Coal (PBC) burning equipment, but the experiment was discontinued and the locomotive returned to black coal operation.

The A2 class, along with other post-1900 VR steam locomotive designs, was equipped with electric lighting from 1926 onwards. Automatic Staff Exchange equipment to allow non-stop high-speed running between track sections was also fitted from 1926 onwards.

Modified front end
In 1933, C class heavy goods locomotive C 5 was equipped with a new front end, based on the Association of American Railroads (AAR) design of self-cleaning smokebox, to improve steaming qualities. The results were very promising, and in 1934 A2998 was selected for a series of further tests aimed at further front end improvement, conducted under the direction of VR Rolling Stock branch engineer, Edgar Brownbill.

Experiments were conducted, based on the work of Dr Wagner of the Deutsche Reichsbahn and E. C. Young of the University of Illinois, with final modifications to the A2 locomotive including:
 Revision of exhaust nozzle and chimney position and diameter, using Wagner's recommended ratios, with a larger  diameter funnel, and a  diameter low exhaust nozzle replacing the original  diameter narrow-flanged chimney and  diameter high exhaust nozzle
 Revision to the firebox grate, using a "rosebud" type grate with reduced air openings to improve fire stability under heavy load and give better firing qualities
 Replacement of full-length  return bend superheater elements with -long  elements

The sum result of the changes was a significant improvement in power and available tractive effort. The improvement was such that the VR was able to further accelerate services hauled by the A2, with the running time of the Melbourne to Bendigo express on the steeply graded  line being cut from 162 to 145 minutes, and literally hours being cut from the schedule of the Melbourne to Adelaide Overland express.

The Modified Front End, which cost just £140 ($280) per locomotive at that time, was an extremely cost-effective improvement, and allowed the VR to defer new locomotive construction. The modification was so successful that not only was the entire A2 fleet converted during 1936–39, but also the C, K, N, S and X class locomotive fleets, and its principles were also incorporated into the design of all subsequent steam locomotives built for VR.

Other changes

In 1935 an experimental A.C.F.I. (Accessoires pour les Chemins de Fer et l'Industrie) feedwater heater was fitted to A2973. However, there was not sufficient improvement in efficiency for the equipment to be fitted to other locomotives and it was removed twelve years later.

With the reduced exhaust blast resulting from the revised smokebox, smoke deflectors were fitted to prevent drifting smoke from obscuring visibility.

In the years following World War II, problems with the quality and availability of coal supplies caused VR to order the conversion of all 60 Walschaerts A2s to oil firing; in practice, only 56 were altered as four were scrapped before the conversion could be completed.

Late in their life, some of the A2s also received Boxpok driving wheels as their conventional spoked wheels began to suffer fatigue cracks with age and mileage.

Later years

In 1939, by which time most of the class was already over twenty-five years old, World War II broke out.  The massive increase in traffic on the VR the war effort brought saw these ageing locomotives subjected to a punishing regime of heavy utilisation and minimal maintenance.

With VR's locomotive workshops switched to production of armaments and all available manpower given to the war effort, plans to eliminate the double-headed A2 operations on Melbourne–Adelaide passenger services with the introduction of more powerful H class 4-8-4 locomotives and additional S class locomotives did not come to fruition.  The extra S class locomotives were never built and the line to Adelaide did not receive the necessary upgrades to take the weight of the H class.

The A2's principal express passenger role continued into the postwar years as the VR, struggling with a backlog of repairs and limited capital expenditure, deferred new passenger locomotive construction. It was not until March 1946 when the first of the class, A2878, was withdrawn from service.

In 1951, when the first of 70 new R class 4-6-4 express passenger locomotives were introduced, the A2 was finally superseded. In 1953, no fewer than 53 A2s went to scrap, followed by 36 more in 1954. However, many of the class (particularly the later Walschaerts variants) continued on in secondary roles such as branch-line passenger and goods services and a number lasted into the 1960s. Their last regular mainline duty was hauling services between Flinders Street and Leongatha, on the South Gippsland line.  The last in service, A2986, was withdrawn on 2 December 1963, exactly 56 years after the original A2572 entered service.

Accidents 

Some A2 locomotives were unfortunate enough to be involved in major accidents:
 At 2:58am on 7 September 1951, the westbound and eastbound Overland expresses, both hauled by double-heading A2s, collided head-on at Serviceton. All four locomotives were written off; three were so badly damaged they were scrapped on site.
 Australia's worst level crossing accident occurred on 8 May 1943, when A2863 collided with a bus carrying troops at Wodonga. 25 people were killed.

List of engines and renumberings

The A2 fleet was constructed in ten batches. All the Stephenson engines, batches 1 to 8, were constructed at the Victorian Railways' Newport Workshops. The same is true of Batch 9 and the first 20 engines of Batch 10. However, engines 1073–1077 (later 973–977) were built at Ballarat Workshops, and 1078–1082 (later 978–982) were built at Bendigo Workshops. There is no indication as to where engines 1083–1092 would have been constructed.

These tables are based on:
 Medlin, P. N. (2004) Victorian Railways Locomotives by Number (self-published, based on Victorian Railways' locomotive repair cards)
 Australian Railway History, August 2019 (Web extra) 
 Victorian Railways locomotive record cards

Stephensons engines

Walschaerts engines

Preservation 

Only one of the original batch of 125 Stephenson A2 locomotives survives; 1913-built A2884 is today preserved at the Newport Railway Museum, along with (Walschaerts) A2995. The museum notes that A2884 ran a total  and A2995 a total  during their service lives.

A2996 is preserved in Victorian regional city of Echuca by the town's wharf and A2964 is preserved at Edwards Lake Park in the Melbourne suburb of Reservoir.

After a 32-year-long effort, Steamrail Victoria restored A2986 to full working order as a coal burner. It first moved under steam on 30 May 2015 and entered service with Steamrail on 13 May 2017.

References

External links 
 Dee et al., Power Parade, VicRail Public Relations Division, Melbourne, 1981, 
 Pearce et al., North Williamstown Railway Museum, ARHS, Melbourne, 1980, 
 The Recorder, ARHS, Adelaide, November 1985, 
 AHRS Railway Museum History 1900–1950 retrieved on 6 September 2006
 National Library of Australia Photograph of prototype A2572, December 1907
 victorianrailways.net Stephenson A2936 hauling a goods train, 11 June 1930.
 victorianrailways.net Walschaerts A2973 leads a Stephenson A2on The Overland, circa 1930
 Public Record Office Victoria Classic VR photograph of A2-hauled passenger train with E type carriages crossing the Malmsbury Viaduct, 1945
 Public Record Office Victoria – A2856 is cut up for scrap.
 victorianrailways.net A2986, seen around 1962 near the end of its service life. Various modifications over the years have significantly altered its appearance from when photographed in 1916 (see top of this page)
 Steamrail A2986 page Photos detailing the progress of current restoration work on A2986

4-6-0 locomotives
A2 class
Railway locomotives introduced in 1907 
Broad gauge locomotives in Australia